Mindhorn is a 2016 British independent comedy film directed by Sean Foley, written by Julian Barratt and Simon Farnaby, and executive produced by Steve Coogan and Ridley Scott. It stars Barratt, Farnaby, Essie Davis, Russell Tovey and Andrea Riseborough, with cameo appearances by Kenneth Branagh and Simon Callow as themselves. Barratt plays Richard Thorncroft, a faded television actor drawn into negotiations with a criminal who believes his character Detective Mindhorn is real.

Plot
Richard Thorncroft is a former television actor, known for playing Detective Bruce Mindhorn, a detective with a cybernetic eye (described as an optical lie detector), which enables him to see truth, from the 80s TV show Mindhorn. 25 years later, on the Isle of Man, where it was filmed, police hunt an escaped lunatic, Paul Melly who's wanted for murder. Melly says he will only speak to Detective Mindhorn, believing Mindhorn is real.

Richard is now washed up, making a living advertising embarrassing products. Hoping to boost his career, he returns to help the case, irritating the local police with his arrogance. Melly's scheduled call to the police station leads to a meeting, ending in Melly's arrest. Richard sets out to reconnect with his Mindhorn co-star and ex, Patricia, discovering she lives with his former stuntman Clive, and daughter Jasmine.

Another of his Mindhorn co-stars, Pete Eastman, now stars in a successful spin-off series. Pete invites Richard around with the promise of a DVD release of Mindhorn, only to mock him. Dejected, Richard parties with his former manager Moncrieff, is detained after a night of drunkenness and cocaine-snorting, and dropped by his agent.

Waiting for his ferry home, Richard opens fan mail, and realises that it's from Melly, including a videotape showing the mayor committing the murder. Richard shows the tape to Moncrieff, who proposes using it to blackmail him. He refuses to give the tape back, but appears to concede after a brief altercation. Richard meets Melly and the police, but discovers Moncrieff has swapped the tape. Moncrieff independently tries to blackmail the mayor but is killed by DS Baines, the mayor's niece and part of the conspiracy.

Melly and Richard escape to Melly's secret lair, filled with Mindhorn merchandise and homemade espionage equipment. Melly equips him with an extensive Mindhorn outfit, explaining he has a copy of the tape in the classic car used in Mindhorn. They escape Baines when Melly throws defective Mindhorn-brand truth powder in her face.

At Patricia and Clive's, Richard finds the car is in the local parade. Patricia finds letters to her from Richard that Clive hid from her. Richard, Melly and Patricia go to get the car from the parade, and are pursued by DS Baines to the beach. Richard finds the "copy" of the tape is just a plasticine model Melly made. Melly is hit by a bullet and appears to die. Baines arrives, and appears to kill Patricia and injure Richard. Richard records Baines' confession on a Mindhorn recorder belt that Melly had him wear.

The police arrive and Richard and Pat get up, having tricked Baines into using a gun with blanks. They prove Baines' and the mayor's roles in the murders with the tape. Richard then rescues Jasmine from Baines as she fires at him, with a gun he believes is also full of blanks. When told that he actually just narrowly dodged several real bullets, Richard faints. After recovering, Richard and Patricia get back together, Baines and the mayor are jailed, and Melly is found alive in his lair.

Cast
Julian Barratt as Richard Thorncroft
 Essie Davis as Patricia Deville
 Kenneth Branagh as himself
 Andrea Riseborough as Detective Sergeant Elena Baines
 Steve Coogan as Peter Eastman
 Russell Tovey as Paul Melly
 Richard McCabe as Jeffrey Moncrieff, Richard's former manager
 Harriet Walter as Richard's agent
 Jessica Barden as Jasmine, Patricia's twenty-year-old daughter
 Simon Callow as himself 
 Simon Farnaby as Clive Parnevik, Richard's stunt double on Mindhorn and later Patricia's lover
 Nicholas Farrell as the Mayor of the Isle of Man
 David Schofield as Chief Inspector Derek Newsome
 Tony Way as dad with newspaper
 Robin Morrissey as PC Green

Release
Mindhorn went on general release in the UK on 5 May 2017, and was screened at the Belfast Film Festival. Netflix acquired the rights to broadcast in all territories outside of the UK for 12 May 2017. The film was nominated for a best debut screenwriter award by the British Independent Film Awards in 2017.

Reception
On Rotten Tomatoes the film has an approval rating of 92% based on reviews from 48 critics. The site's consensus was, "Led by a committed performance from Julian Barratt, Mindhorn offers audiences a laugh-out-loud comedy whose sublime silliness is enhanced by its more thoughtful moments."

References

External links 
 

2016 films
2010s crime comedy films
British crime comedy films
Films set on the Isle of Man
Films shot in the Isle of Man
British independent films
Films set in 1989
Films set in 2016
2016 directorial debut films
2016 comedy films
Films scored by David Holmes (musician)
2010s English-language films
2010s British films